Gnatholycosa is a genus of spiders in the family Lycosidae. It was first described in 1940 by Mello-Leitão. , it contains only one species, Gnatholycosa spinipalpis, found in Argentina.

References

Lycosidae
Monotypic Araneomorphae genera
Spiders of Argentina